Aaron Covington (born June 5, 1984) is an American screenwriter and sound designer from Northwest Indiana.

Early life 
He attended Ohio State University and graduated from the University of Southern California in 2011 with a MFA in film production. He took part in numerous productions for the USC School of Cinematic Arts as a sound designer.

Career 
Covington co-wrote the screenplay for the 2015 film Creed, a spin-off-sequel to the Rocky film series, starring Sylvester Stallone and Michael B. Jordan, with Ryan Coogler, who  also directed the film. Covington is a personal friend of Coogler, and the two worked together with Stallone to green-light the film with MGM studios.

Covington wrote and directed the storyline for the MyCareer mode in the video game NBA 2K17.

References

External links

Creed — Official Movie Site

Living people
American male screenwriters
People from Michigan City, Indiana
USC School of Cinematic Arts alumni
1984 births
Screenwriters from Indiana